Shanglakpam Nilakanta Sharma (born 2 May 1995) is an Indian field hockey player who plays as a midfielder for the Indian national team.

He was part of the Indian squad that won the 2016 Men's Hockey Junior World Cup.

Career
Hailing from Kontha Ahallup Makha Leikai in Imphal East, Nilakanta started playing hockey in 2003. He played for Posterior Hockey Academy Manipur until 2011 when he switched to Bhopal Hockey Academy. He was selected for the national junior team for the 2014 Sultan of Johor Cup and drafted by the Dabang Mumbai franchise of the Hockey India League.

References

External links
Nilakanta Sharma at Hockey India

Meitei Brahmins
Brahmins of Manipur
1995 births
Living people
People from Imphal East district
Indian male field hockey players
Field hockey players from Manipur
Male field hockey midfielders
Olympic field hockey players of India
Field hockey players at the 2020 Summer Olympics
2018 Men's Hockey World Cup players
Olympic bronze medalists for India
Medalists at the 2020 Summer Olympics
Olympic medalists in field hockey
Field hockey players at the 2022 Commonwealth Games
Commonwealth Games silver medallists for India
Commonwealth Games medallists in field hockey
Recipients of the Arjuna Award
2023 Men's FIH Hockey World Cup players
Medallists at the 2022 Commonwealth Games